Qalayet bandora (Arabic: قلاية بندورة أو مسقة بندورة,  "pan of tomatoes") is a simple Jordanian and Palestinian dish of tomatoes, onions, hot peppers (usually serranos or jalapenos), olive oil, and salt. It is popular across the Levant, but especially in Palestine and Jordan on account of its easy preparation and healthy ingredients. To make the dish, the olive oil is heated in a large frying pan. The onions and peppers are diced and the tomatoes are cubed and optionally peeled. The onions are then added and cooked until translucent, at which point the rest of the ingredients are added and the mixture is sautéed until it is thick but not dry. Qalayet bandora is usually eaten with warm pita bread, which is used to scoop it up, though qalayet bandora can also be served over rice and eaten with utensils. When served in a restaurant or at a formal event, it is often garnished with toasted pine nuts.

Many varieties of the dish exist, including with meat (ground beef or beef or lamb stew meat), fried eggs, or garlic.

It is believed to originate in the Ghor al-Safi and Ghor al Mazraa, the rural regions surrounding the Dead Sea that make up the "breadbasket" of Jordan. The hot climate in these regions of the Jordan Valley is ideal for growing tomatoes.

Because it is an easy one-pot meal, qalayet bandora is often eaten while camping or backpacking.

See also
Huevos rancheros
Lecsó, a similar Hungarian dish
Matbukha, the Maghrebi version
Pisto (from Spain)
Shakshuka, qalayet bandora with eggs and spices

References

External links 
 Recipe for Qalayet Bandora
 Recipe for Qalayet Bandora with meat

Arab cuisine
Jordanian cuisine
Levantine cuisine
Palestinian cuisine
Tomato dishes